Kamali is an Indian Kannada language television soap opera that premiered on 28 May 2018 and aired on Zee Kannada. The show stars Amulya Omkar and Niranjan in lead roles.

Cast
 Amulya Gowda as Kamali and Ambi
 Niranjan as Rishi
 Rachana Smith as Anika
 Padma Vasanthi as Annapoorna Mahajan
 Sanjay as Chandrakant/Chandru
 Yamuna Srinidhi as Gauri/Saroja/Mangalamma
 Swapna Dheekshith as Tara
 Mico Manju as Ramesh
 Ankietha as Ningi
 Shilpa Iyer as Hasini
 Deekhsheet Shetty
 Yashaswini Ravindra as Rachana

Adaptations

References

External links
 

2018 Indian television series debuts
Zee Kannada original programming
Kannada-language television shows
2022 Indian television series endings